1/5 may refer to:

January 5, the date
1 May, the date
quintile, a 5-quantile in statistics
one fifth, the ordinal form of the number 5
one and five, 1 shilling and 5 pence in pre-decimal British Coinage
1st Battalion 5th Marines
one to five betting odds

See also
 5
 Quintile (disambiguation)